Harry and the Hendersons is an American sitcom based on the film of the same name, produced by Amblin Television for Universal Television. It aired in syndication from January 13, 1991, to June 18, 1993, with 72 half-hour episodes produced. It is about a family who adopts a Bigfoot called Harry.

Synopsis
Bruce Davison and Molly Cheek played the parents George and Nancy (in the film, they were played by John Lithgow and Melinda Dillon respectively) with Carol-Ann Plante and Zachary Bostrom as the children Sarah and Ernie (in the film, they were played by Margaret Langrick and Joshua Rudoy respectively). Kevin Peter Hall played the role of Harry in both the film and TV series, until his death late in the production of the first season. He was replaced first by Dawan Scott and then by Brian Steele in the third season (Steele had filled in for Scott in the Harry costume for numerous scenes during season two, before taking over the role full-time). Harry's vocal effects were provided by Patrick Pinney, where the vocal effects were previously provided by Fred Newman in the film.

In the series, George and Nancy were an upwardly mobile two-career couple, with the former working for a sporting goods company. George eventually launched his own magazine, The Better Life, late in the second season. Initially helping the Hendersons with Harry's care, and Sasquatch research, was Walter Potter, a biologist working for the Department of Animal Control. Also seen early on were the Glicks, neighbors of the Hendersons; Samantha was a pretty, young single mother and reporter, and Tiffany was her precocious little girl, a classmate of Ernie's who had an obvious crush on him.  Samantha, Tiffany, and Walter were all written out after the first season, but the aspect of having a girl next door who chased after Ernie was retained through a new character, Darcy Payne, for the 1991–92 season. Darcy was more annoying than her predecessor, and spent all her waking hours trying to make the Hendersons' young son hers. However, she did catch on to the fact that the family was hiding a bigfoot, and had several close encounters with Harry; fortunately, Darcy disappeared from the show before she could have exposed the secret about him. Nancy's younger brother Brett, a photographer, moved in with the Hendersons in the second season, and was also sworn to secrecy about Harry.  When George began The Better Life in the spring of 1992, Brett was hired as the publication's chief photographer and a financial beneficiary.

The following year brought many changes, as in the season premiere Harry's existence was accidentally exposed. Just as the Hendersons feared he would be captured by the government and possibly killed, he was rather embraced by the public and received overnight regional fame. For a while, Harry had to adjust to a high-profile life full of exhibition and additional scientific studies, but at the same time the entire family got used to resting more comfortably now that they did not have to hide the big creature from view anymore. Hilton, a friend of Ernie's and the son of a local police chief, joined the cast in the third season.

The TV series credits contains an artistic representation of key scenes from the film.

Cast
 Kevin Peter Hall as Harry (1991)
 Dawan Scott as Harry (1991–1992)
 Brian Steele as Harry (1992–1993)
 N. Brock Winkless IV as Harry (face performer, 1991–1993)
 Patrick Pinney as Harry (vocal effects, 1991–1993)
 Bruce Davison as George Henderson
 Molly Cheek as Nancy Henderson
 Carol-Ann Plante as Sarah Henderson
 Zachary Bostrom as Ernie Henderson
 Gigi Rice as Samantha Glick (1991)
 Cassie Cole as Tiffany Glick (1991)
 David Coburn as Walter Potter (1991)
 Noah Blake as Brett Douglas (1991–1993)
 Courtney Peldon as Darcy Payne (1991–1992)
 Mark Dakota Robinson as Hilton Woods, Jr. (1992–1993)
 Jared Henderson as Himself (1992)

Episodes

Season 1: 1991

Season 2: 1991–92

Season 3: 1992–93

Production
Among the series' directors were series star Bruce Davison, Scott Baio, Frank Bonner, Tony Dow, Richard Kline, Dwayne Hickman, and Donna Pescow.

The series' theme song was "Your Feet's Too Big", performed by Leon Redbone.

Reruns aired on digital subchannel Retro Television Network from August 2008 until their distribution agreement with NBCUniversal ended in June 2011.

Broadcast stations

References

External links
 

1991 American television series debuts
1993 American television series endings
1990s American sitcoms
American fantasy television series
Television about Bigfoot
First-run syndicated television programs in the United States
English-language television shows
Fantasy comedy television series
Live action television shows based on films
Television series about families
Television series by Universal Television
Television shows set in Washington (state)
Cryptozoological television series
Television series by Amblin Entertainment